Yuhana Yokoi (born May 19, 2000) is a retired Japanese figure skater. She is the 2019 CS Finlandia Trophy bronze medalist and the 2020 International Challenge Cup silver medalist. She finished within the top ten at two World Junior Championships (2018, 2019).

She is currently the 22nd highest ranked ladies' singles skater in the world by the International Skating Union following the 2019-20 figure skating season.

Career

Early years 
Yokoi began learning to skate in 2008. She made her ISU Junior Grand Prix debut in September 2014, placing sixth in Nagoya, Japan. At the 2015–16 Japan Championships, she won bronze in the junior event and finished eleventh in the senior event.

2017–18 season 
At the 2017–18 Japan Championships, Yokoi finished fourth in the junior event and eighth in the senior event. In March, she competed at the 2018 World Junior Championships in Sofia, Bulgaria. Ranked eighth in the short and fourth in the free, she finished sixth overall.

2018–19 season 
In October, Yokoi won bronze at the ISU Junior Grand Prix in Armenia. In November, she became Japan's junior national champion. She finished seventh competing in the senior ranks at the 2018–19 Japan Championships in December.

In March, she placed eighteenth in the short, eighth in the free, and ninth overall at the 2019 World Junior Championships in Zagreb, Croatia.

In April, she was invited to skate in the gala at the 2019 World Team Trophy as the Japan junior national champion.

2019–20 season 
In October, making her senior international debut, Yokoi won the bronze medal at the 2019 CS Finlandia Trophy. In November, she competed at two Grand Prix events, placing sixth at the 2019 Rostelecom Cup and fourth at the 2019 NHK Trophy. The following month, she finished fifth at the 2019–20 Japan Championships.

In February 2020, Yokoi won silver at the International Challenge Cup in The Hague, Netherlands.

2020–21 season 
With the COVID-19 pandemic limiting international competitions, Yokoi was assigned to compete at the 2020 NHK Trophy, which was attended almost exclusively by Japanese skaters.  She was fifth in the short program, her only error being an under-rotation on her solo triple flip jump.  In the free skate, she made several errors, finishing eighth in that segment and dropping to eighth place overall.

Yokoi placed eighth at the 2020–21 Japan Championships.

2021–22 season 
Yokoi placed eleventh at the 2021 Skate America, her lone Grand Prix assignment. She was ninth at the 2021 Internationaux de France, saying that she was very pleased with her free skate: "I still wonder if I should continue, and when I have a good performance, I am truly happy, and that is why it keeps me going. Today's good performance made me feel that I might be able to continue." 

At the 2021–22 Japan Championships, Yokoi placed twelfth. She was named to the Japanese team for the 2022 Four Continents Championships, where she finished in seventh.

2022–23 season 
In her lone Grand Prix assignment of the year, Yokoi finished eighth at the 2022 Skate Canada International. After coming nineteenth at the 2022–23 Japan Championships, she announced her retirement from competitive skating.

Programs

Competitive highlights 
GP: Grand Prix; CS: Challenger Series; JGP: Junior Grand Prix

Detailed results 
ISU Personal best highlighted in bold.

Senior

Junior

References

External links 

 

2000 births
Japanese female single skaters
Living people
Figure skaters from Nagoya